The 2001–2002 FINA Swimming World Cup was a series of nine international short course (25m) swimming meets organized by FINA. The meets were held in nine different cities, from November 2001 through January 2002. Each featured 34 events: seventeen for males and seventeen for females.

Ed Moses of the US and Martina Moravcová of Slovakia were the overall male and female winners of the series. The 2001–2002 World Cup saw 22 world records bettered.

Meets
Dates and locations for the 2001–2002 World Cup meets were:

Event winners

50 freestyle

100 freestyle

200 freestyle

400 freestyle

1500/800 freestyle

50 Backstroke

100 Backstroke

200 Backstroke

50 Breaststroke

100 Breaststroke

200 Breaststroke

50 Butterfly

* In prelims of the Berlin meet, Huegill swam a 22.74 to lower the World and Cup records again.

100 Butterfly

200 Butterfly

100 Individual Medley

200 Individual Medley

400 Individual Medley

References

FINA Swimming World Cup
2001 in swimming
2002 in swimming